The People's National Party (PNP or NNP; ; Narodnaya natsionalnaya partiya, NNP) was a minor far-right political party in Russia. Its leader was Aleksandr Ivanov-Sukharevsky, who founded the party in 1994 with, it has been alleged, the aid of two veterans of the Black Hundreds Vladimir Osipov and Vyacheslav Demin.

Origins
The party grew from an attempt by Ivanov-Sukharevsky to get himself elected to the Co-ordinating Council of the Russian All-People's Union in January 1994. Although a fairly well-known figure he was not a member of this party and in a vote he was narrowly defeated in his aspiration. He linked up with Vyacheslav Demin, the editor of the journal Zemshchina and the two set about establishing a party that they claimed would represent the Russian Orthodox Church. The new group adopted the name Movement of Popular Nationalists and Ivanov-Sukharevsky was chosen as chairman upon its establishment in October 1994. In December the group merged with a group based around Vladimir Popov's Era Rossii magazine, the National-Socialist Movement(a group that fused neo-Nazism and monarchism in what was a not uncommon feature of the Russian far right), to form the NNP proper.

Support
In March 1999 Ivanov-Sukharevsky was arrested for promoting national hatred and whilst awaiting trial he was held in the same cell as Semyon Tokmakov, the head of the white power skinhead group Russian Goal. The two became allies in prison leading to a close link being forged between Tokmaov's skinheads and the NNP. Tokmakov eventually fused his group into the NNP's youth movement and took over editing duties on the fourth page of the party organ Ya-Russky, in the process making the paper one of the widest read amongst Russian skinheads.

Ideology
The NNP ideology is based on the ideas of 'Russism', a creation of Ivanov-Sukharevsky. It seeks to link earlier ideas of Russian Orthodox monarchism to Nazism, with Nicholas II of Russia and Adolf Hitler the two great heroes of Russism as, they claim, Hitler sought to revenge the Tsar for his killing by Jewish Bolsheviks.  However, although Russism avowedly links itself to Russian Orthodoxy, in practice the NNP has also been open to those elements of Neopaganism favoured by many of its skinhead followers.

In contrast to some groups on the Russian far right, where bitter factionalism has often predominated, the NNP has been keen to work with other like-minded groups. As a result of one such initiative the party absorbed the wing of the National-Republican Party of Russia (NRPR) loyal to Yuri Belyaev in December 1997 after that group had split into two separate groups, both claiming the original name, in 1994. The merger, which brought a significant increase in party membership due to Belyaev's well developed network of local cells, proved short-lived however and his wing of the NRPR was reconstituted the following year after he quarrelled with Ivanov-Sukharevsky.

Publications
The NNP has published a number of journals apart from Ya-Russky. These have included Zemshchina, based in Moscow, began publishing in 1990 and eventually became the official NNP organ. Its regular features included columns entitled "Holy Russia", "Aryan Unity", "Rightists Old and New", "Church Life" and "Our Culture". A Tomsk-based weekly bulletin Cherny korpus (Black Corps), appeared in December 1995 and included local party news. Ivanov-Sukharevsky himself edited the political monthly Era Rossii(Era of Russia), which achieved a print-run of 25,000. This publication eventually expanded to include a regular section on white power music.

Within the pages of Ya-Russky articles praising fellow right-extremists such as Pamyat and Russian National Unity have appeared, as well as an article marking the hundredth anniversary of The Protocols of the Elders of Zion.

Decline
On 3 October 2003 the headquarters of the NNP were damaged in a bomb attack which resulted in Ivanov-Sukharevsky suffering serious injuries and possible blindness. The injuries sustained saw him depart politics and so the NNP fall into decline with its skinhead membership largely departing to other groups.

References

1994 establishments in Russia
Eastern Orthodoxy and far-right politics
Fascist parties in Russia
Monarchist parties in Russia
Neo-Nazi political parties in Europe
Neo-Nazism in Russia
Political parties established in 1994
Anti-communist parties
2009 disestablishments in Russia
Fascism in Russia
Neo-fascist parties
Defunct nationalist parties in Russia
Russian nationalist parties
Political parties disestablished in 2009
Defunct far-right parties
Far-right political parties in Russia